Charles Henry Van Wyck (May 10, 1824October 24, 1895) was a Representative from New York, a Senator from Nebraska, and a Union Army brigadier general in the American Civil War.

Early life and political career
Van Wyck was born in Poughkeepsie, New York.  He was a distant cousin of Robert Anderson Van Wyck and Augustus Van Wyck; their common ancestors were Theodorus Van Wyck (1668-1753) and his wife Margretia Brinckerhoff Van Wyck. He completed preparatory studies and graduated from Rutgers College, New Brunswick, New Jersey, in 1843. Van Wyck studied law, and was admitted to the bar in 1847 and commenced the practice of law. He then moved to Bloomingburg, New York, where he became the district attorney of Sullivan County, New York (1850-1856).

Van Wyck was elected to the U.S. House of Representatives as a Republican from New York to the Thirty-sixth and Thirty-seventh Congresses (March 4, 1859 – March 3, 1863). He served as chairman, Committee on Mileage (Thirty-sixth Congress) and on the Committee on Revolutionary Pensions (Thirty-seventh Congress). While in Congress, Van Wyck was a prominent member of an investigation into fraud at the New York Custom House and played a crucial role in the passage of the Fraud Claims Act. In his minority report to the investigation committee he famously wrote: “Worse than traitors in arms are the men, pretending loyalty to the flag, who feast and
fatten on the misfortunes of the nation, while patriot blood is crimsoning the plains of the south, and the bodies of their countrymen are mouldering in dust.”

Assassination attempt
Van Wyck delivered a harsh anti-slavery speech on the House floor on March 7, 1860, which denounced the Southern states for the "crime against the laws of God and nature." The speech was widely reported. On February 22, 1861, Van Wyck was assaulted near the United States Capitol by three men in an assassination attempt, an attack which was reported as related to the prior year's speech. Van Wyck fought off the attack, surviving only because a notebook and copy of the Congressional Globe which he had kept in the breast pocket of his coat had blocked the blade of a Bowie knife. The three men fled and were never identified. This was also the same night as an alleged attempt was made to assassinate president-elect Abraham Lincoln in Baltimore, Maryland.

Civil War
During the American Civil War Van Wyck entered the Union Army as colonel and commanding officer of the 56th New York Infantry Regiment. Part of the Army of the Potomac during the Peninsula Campaign; Van Wyck was wounded in the knee at the Battle of Fair Oaks. Much of the war was then spent as brigade and district commander in South Carolina; taking part in the Siege of Charleston Harbor and the Battle of Honey Hill. In 1865 he was brevetted brigadier general for his services during the war. He eventually received the substantial promotion to brigadier general before he was mustered out in 1866.

Postbellum career
Van Wyck was elected to the Fortieth Congress (March 4, 1867 – March 3, 1869); successfully contested the election of George Woodward Greene to the Forty-first Congress and served from February 17, 1870 to March 3, 1871.

He moved to Nebraska in 1874, where he settled on a farm in Otoe County, and engaged in agricultural pursuits. Van Wyck was a delegate to the State constitutional convention in 1875.  He was elected to the State senate 1877, 1879, 1881. That year, he was elected as a Republican to the United States Senate from Nebraska and served from March 4, 1881 to March 3, 1887. He served as chairman, Committee on the Mississippi River and Its Tributaries (Forty-seventh Congress) and on the Committee on the Improvement of the Mississippi River and Tributaries (Forty-eighth and Forty-ninth Congresses). Van Wyck was an unsuccessful candidate for reelection.  In 1892, he was an unsuccessful Populist candidate for Governor of Nebraska. Van Wyck then retired from political life and active business pursuits. He died in Washington, D.C., and was interred beside his wife, Kate Brodhead, in Milford Cemetery, Milford, Pennsylvania.

Gallery

See also

Baltimore Plot
List of American Civil War generals (Union)

References

Other sources
Dictionary of American Biography; Harmar, Marie V. and James L. Sellers. "Charles Henry Van Wyck: Soldier-Statesman of New York and Nebraska."
Nebraska Historical Magazine 12 (April–June 1929): 80-129, 12 (July–September 1929): 190-246, 12 (October–December 1929): 322-73.

External links

  at the Nebraska State Historical Society

1824 births
1895 deaths
Politicians from Poughkeepsie, New York
Charles Henry
American people of Dutch descent
Republican Party members of the United States House of Representatives from New York (state)
Republican Party United States senators from Nebraska
Nebraska Populists
Republican Party Nebraska state senators
Sullivan County district attorneys
19th-century American politicians
Rutgers University alumni
People of New York (state) in the American Civil War
Union Army generals